Haley de Jong (born January 18, 2001) is a Canadian artistic gymnast and the 2018 Pacific Rim Uneven Bars champion.

Early life 
Haley de Jong was born in Vancouver, British Columbia in 2001.

Gymnastics career

Junior

2013–2015 
De Jong made her elite debut at Elite Canada in 2013 where she placed fourth in the novice division. In 2015 she once again competed at Elite Canada and placed seventh in the all-around in the Junior division. She also placed fifth on balance beam and won silver on floor exercise.  In February 2015 she competed at the Canada Games where she placed eighth on the balance beam but won bronze with the team from British Columbia.  In March 2015 de Jong made her international debut when she competed at International Gymnix where she placed eighteenth in the all-around and fourth in the team final.  In May she competed at the Canadian Championships where she placed seventh in the all-around.

2016 
De Jong competed at Elite Canada in February where she placed twelfth in the all-around, eighth on uneven bars, and won bronze on floor exercise.  A week later she competed at the WOGA Classic where she placed second in the all-around behind Irina Alexeeva.  In March de Jong competed at International Gymnix where she placed twenty-third in the all-around but won bronze in the team final.  Later that year she competed at the Canadian Championships where she placed fourth in the all-around behind Ana Padurariu, Sayge Urban, and Brooklyn Moors.  In September de Jong competed at the Pan American Championships where helped Canada win the team gold medal.  Individually she placed fourth in the all-around behind Padurariu, Thais Fidelis of Brazil, and Urban, fifth on vault, and won bronze on balance behind Padurariu and Fidelis.  In November de Jong competed at the Olympic Hopes Cup where she placed sixth in the all-around.

Senior

2017
In 2017 de Jong officially turned senior but spent most of the season dealing with injuries.  She competed at the Salamunov Memorial in Maribor, Slovenia in October where she swept the competition.  In December she competed at Toyota International in Japan where she placed fourth on floor exercise and eleventh on uneven bars and balance beam.

2018
In February de Jong competed at Elite Canada where she placed fourth in the all-around, third on vault, second on uneven bars, and eighth on balance beam and floor exercise.  In March she competed at International Gymnix where she placed tenth in the all-around, seventh on vault, and tenth on uneven bars.  She was later selected to represent Canada at the 2018 Pacific Rim Championships.  While there she won bronze in the all-around and on floor exercise, gold on uneven bars, silver in the team final, and placed fifth on vault.  A month later de Jong competed at the Canadian National Championships where she placed seventh in the all-around.  In November de Jong signed her National Letter of Intent with the University of Georgia.

2019
De Jong competed at Elite Canada where she placed 22nd in the all-around and seventh on balance beam.  The following month she competed at 2019 L'International Gymnix where she placed seventh in the all-around but won silver on vault, floor exercise, and in the team final alongside Laurie Denommée, Isabela Onyshko, and Emma Spence.

In May de Jong competed at the Canadian National Championships.  She finished sixth in the all-around.

NCAA

2019–20 
De Jong started her collegiate career in the 2019-2020 season with the Georgia Gymdogs.  She competed on uneven bars and balance beam in all ten meets, earning a career high of 9.925 on the latter in a meet against Arkansas.  All post-season meets, such as the SEC Championships and the NCAA Women's Gymnastics Championships, ended up being canceled due to the COVID-19 pandemic in the United States.

Competitive history

References

External links 
 Haley de Jong on the Gymnastics Canada website
 

2001 births
Living people
Canadian female artistic gymnasts
Georgia Gym Dogs gymnasts
Sportspeople from Vancouver
21st-century Canadian women